YRE may refer to:

 Young Reporters for the Environment
 Youth against Racism in Europe
 Radio Broadcasting Service (Yperesia Radiofonikes Ekpompes, Υπηρεσία Ραδιοφωνικής Εκπομπής), a predecessor of the Hellenic Broadcasting Corporation